Naematelia is a genus of fungi in the family Naemateliaceae. All Naematelia species are parasites of other fungi (Stereum species) and produce anamorphic yeast states. Basidiocarps (fruit bodies), when produced, are gelatinous and are colloquially classed among the "jelly fungi". Four species of Naematelia are currently recognized worldwide. One species, Naematelia aurantialba, is commercially cultivated for food.

Taxonomy

History
Naematelia was introduced in 1816 by Elias Magnus Fries for fungal fruit bodies having a gelatinous outer layer and a hard inner core, as in the type species Naematelia encephala. The name was subsequently used by some mycologists, whilst others considered Naematelia synonymous with Tremella since its basidia were Tremella-like. In a 1961 paper, American mycologist Robert Bandoni showed that the hard inner core of Naematelia encephala was composed largely of host tissue (Stereum sanguinolentum) and that Naematelia therefore represented no more than a Tremella species and its host.

Molecular research, based on cladistic analysis of DNA sequences, has however shown that Tremella is polyphyletic (and hence artificial). A different generic name was therefore required for a group of species not closely related to Tremella mesenterica (the type species of Tremella) and in 2015 Naematelia was selected as the earliest such name available. Comparatively few species, however, have yet been sequenced.

Description
Fruit bodies are gelatinous (but may have a hard inner core mainly composed of host hyphae) and are variously cephaliform (like a brain, with folds and ridges), lobed, or foliose (with leaf-like or seaweed-like fronds). Colours are typically pinkish, ochraceous, yellow, or brown.

Microscopic characters
Naematelia species produce hyphae that are clamped and have haustorial cells from which hyphal filaments seek out and penetrate the hyphae of the host. The basidia are "tremelloid" (globose to ellipsoid, sometimes stalked, and vertically or diagonally septate), giving rise to long, sinuous sterigmata or epibasidia on which the basidiospores are produced. These spores are smooth, globose to ellipsoid, and germinate by hyphal tube or by yeast cells. Conidiophores are often present, producing conidiospores that are similar to yeast cells.

Habitat and distribution
Species are parasitic on fruit bodies of Stereum species that grow on dead attached or fallen wood. Hosts include Stereum hirsutum on broadleaf trees and Stereum sanguinolentum on conifers. 

As a group, Naematelia species occur worldwide, though individual species may have a more restricted distribution.

Species and hosts

References

Tremellomycetes